Darion Conner (born September 28, 1967, in Macon, Mississippi) is a former American / arena football linebacker in the National Football League (NFL) and the Arena Football League (AFL).  He played for eight seasons in the NFL, from 1990 to 1997 and seven seasons (1999–2005) in the AFL.  He was drafted in the second round (28th overall) of the 1990 NFL Draft by the Atlanta Falcons.  He played college football at Jackson State University.  He is currently serving a 15-year prison sentence for DUI-manslaughter and Vehicular Homicide.  However, in July 2008, an appeals court ruled that he would be given a retrial.

In his career, Conner has played for the New Orleans Saints, Carolina Panthers, Philadelphia Eagles, Cleveland Browns, and Tampa Bay Storm. He is the highest NFL draft pick to ever play for the Tampa Bay Storm.

High school and college careers
In high school, Conner was a three-year All-State selection as a fullback and linebacker for Noxubee County High School.  He also lettered in track and was second in the state in the 100 meters.  He later attended Jackson State, where he was a First-team All-SWAC in his four seasons there.  He was named the 1989 SWAC Defensive Player of the Year and attended the Senior Bowl, the East-West Shrine Game, and the Blue-Gray Classic, of which he was named the defensive MVP.  He was a three-year NCAA All-America selection and was named to the Kodak and Sheraton All-American teams.

Professional career

National Football League (1990–1999)
Conner was selected in the second round (28th overall) of the 1990 NFL Draft by the Atlanta Falcons.  He played for the Falcons for four seasons before joining the New Orleans Saints where he played for one season, which happened to be the best season of his career, he recorded 10.5 sacks.  He then went and played for the expansion Carolina Panthers.  He was then signed on September 18, 1996, by the Philadelphia Eagles.  He played two seasons there before being signed on December 22, 1998, along with defensive back Corey Dowden, as one of the original members of the "new" Cleveland Browns.  But was released on June 3, 1999.  He never played in the NFL again after being released by the Browns.

NFL statistics

Arena Football League (1999–2005)
After being released by the Cleveland Browns, Conner signed with the Tampa Bay Storm of the Arena Football League on July 20.  As a rookie in 1999, he played in the final two games of the season.  He recorded a sack and two tackles, in his first game, on the road against the San Jose SaberCats on July 24.  He was named Ironman of the Game in his second game, against the New England Sea Wolves.  In that game he recorded his first touchdown in the AFL, a 23-yard screen pass.

In 2000, his first full season in the AFL, Conner opened the season by sacking New England quarterback Chad Salisbury.  On the play Conner also forced a fumble that led to a Storm touchdown.  He missed five games during the season, but had a strong performance on July 1 against the Orlando Predators, recording a career-high six tackles and recording 2.5 sacks in a win.  He led the Storm in sacks on the season, he also recorded 15 total tackles.

In 2001, Conner made his largest impact on defense for the Storm.  He played in 12 games and recorded 20 tackles, including three for loss and 2.5 sacks.  He also broke up two passes and forced two fumbles.  He tied for second on the team in sacks.  As he did in the previous season, he recorded the first team sack of the season in the season opener against the Florida Bobcats.  On June 25 at Florida he returned Willie Wyatt's blocked field goal three yards for a touchdown.  He forced fumbles in back-to-back games, on the road against the Grand Rapids Rampage at home against the Carolina Cobras.

In 2002, Conner led the team with 3.5 tackles for loss, finishing the regular season with 10.5 total tackles and one sack.  In at least two games on the season he played OL / DL.

In 2003, Conner missed the first two games with an ankle injury.  He was placed on injured reserve May 17, 2003.  For the season, he recorded seven tackles (two solo), one carry for six yards.

In 2004, Conner played in ten games and finished tied for second on the team with two sacks.  He moved into ninth place on the Storm's career sacks list.  He finished the season with 12 total tackles (ten solo), one pass break up, and one forced fumble.

In 2005, Conner recorded one pass break up, before being arrested and charged with DUI-manslaughter and Vehicular Homicide.

Arrest and conviction
In 2005, Conner was arrested and convicted of DUI-manslaughter and Vehicular homicide, after a September 4, 2004 car accident left a bicyclist, Jonathan Michael Conklin, 32 of Carrollwood, Florida, dead.  A witness testified at Conner's July 2005 trial, that just before 2 a.m. on September 4, 2004, Conner was driving a Toyota Land Cruiser on Linebaugh Avenue.  They also said that Conner's headlights were off when he first turned onto Linebaugh.  He then turned them on but swerved across the road lines.  The prosecution argued that Conner veered into the bike lane and struck Conklin.

Conner was convicted of DUI-manslaughter and Vehicular Homicide and is currently serving a 15-year prison sentence, the maximum allowed punishment.  In July 2008, an appeals court ruled that he would be given a retrial.

Notes

External links
 Tampa Bay Storm bio
 Stats at ArenaFan
 Philadelphia Eagles profile at ESPN.com
 Profile at Pro Football Reference
 Stats at Football Database

Living people
1967 births
American football linebackers
Jackson State Tigers football players
Atlanta Falcons players
New Orleans Saints players
Carolina Panthers players
Philadelphia Eagles players
Cleveland Browns players
Tampa Bay Storm players
American people convicted of manslaughter
Prisoners and detainees of Florida
People from Macon, Mississippi